Sandro Meira Ricci (born 19 November 1974) is a retired Brazilian football referee and currently serves as a TV refereeing analyst for Globo Network. He refereed at 2014 FIFA World Cup qualifiers, beginning with the match between Ecuador and Paraguay on 26 March 2013.

In March 2013, FIFA added Ricci to its list of candidate referees for the 2014 FIFA World Cup.

Ricci was the Brazilian referee at the 2014 FIFA World Cup, along with assistant referees Emerson de Carvalho and Marcelo Van Gasse. During his debut match France-Honduras, which was played on 15 June 2014, he was the first referee in the world to validate a goal by means of the newly introduced  goal line technology. He was selected once again to be the Brazilian referee at the 2018 FIFA World Cup on Russia. After the tournament, he announced his retirement as a referee. After stepping down on his referee career, he was hired as a football refereeing and rules analyst by Globo.

Referring Statistics

References

1974 births
Living people
Brazilian football referees
Brazilian people of Italian descent
2014 FIFA World Cup referees
FIFA World Cup referees
Copa América referees
2018 FIFA World Cup referees
Football referees at the 2016 Summer Olympics